Wallander is a film series based on the Kurt Wallander novels written by Henning Mankell that were adapted into multiple miniseries and TV films by Sveriges Television (SVT) between 1994 and 2006. These Swedish-language films starred Rolf Lassgård as Wallander. The final film Pyramiden (2007) features Gustaf Skarsgård as a younger Wallander.

Film series
Faceless Killers (Mördare utan ansikte). Made in 1994; directed by Per Berglund, with screenplay by Lars Bjorkman.
The Dogs of Riga (Hundarna i Riga). Made in 1995; directed by Per Berglund, with screenplay by Lars Bjorkman.
The White Lioness (Den Vita lejoninnan). Made in 1996; directed by Per Berglund, with screenplay by Lars Bjorkman.
Sidetracked (Villospår). Made in 2001; directed by Leif Magnusson, with screenplay by Henning Mankell.
The Fifth Woman (Den 5e kvinnan). Made in 2002; directed by Birger Larsen, with screenplay by Klas Abrahamsson and Birger Larsen.
The Man Who Smiled (Mannen som log). Made in 2003; directed by Leif Lindblom, with screenplay by Klas Abrahamsson and Michael Hjorth.
One Step Behind (Steget efter). Made in 2005; directed by Birger Larsen, with screenplay by Klas Abrahamsson and Michael Hjorth.
Firewall (Brandvägg). Made in 2006; directed by Lisa Siwe, with screenplay by Michael Hjorth.
The Pyramid (Pyramiden). Made in 2007; directed by Daniel Lind Lagerlöf, with screenplay by Michael Hjorth. Released on video only.

Series UK airdates and ratings

References 

Swedish film series
Film series